Leonard Roscoe Tanner (born October 15, 1951) is a retired American tennis player, who turned professional in 1972 and reached a career-high singles ranking of world No. 4 on July 30, 1979.

He is also known for winning the men's singles title at the first of two Australian Open tournaments held in 1977. Tanner won the tournament held in January, Vitas Gerulaitis won the December tournament. Tanner reached the Wimbledon final in 1979, losing to Björn Borg in five sets.

After his retirement, Tanner received media attention in the 2000s for legal problems that included stretches of imprisonment, arrests for missing child support payments, allegations of financial misdeeds, and bankruptcy.

Early life
Leonard Roscoe Tanner III hailed from Lookout Mountain, Tennessee, graduated from Baylor School in Chattanooga, and with teammate Sandy Mayer helped to lead Stanford University's rise to national prominence in collegiate tennis. Tanner played number one singles, with Mayer playing number two. In 1972, Tanner and Mayer won the NCAA doubles championship, and the Stanford team finished second in the NCAA tournament, behind Trinity (TX). The team also featured Chico Hagey, Rick Fisher, Jim Delaney, Gery Groslimond, Chip Fisher, Paul Sidone, and Tim Noonan.

Playing history
Tanner defeated Haroon Rahim 10–8 in the fifth set to win the 1970 United States Amateur Championships.

Tanner defeated Guillermo Vilas in three straight sets in the 1977 Australian Open (January) final, to win his first and only grand slam title. Tanner lost a five set match to Björn Borg in the 1979 Wimbledon final, which was the first Wimbledon final to be broadcast live in the United States as part of NBC's Breakfast at Wimbledon. Tanner avenged this loss to Borg by beating him in four sets in the US Open quarterfinals two months later, a match where Tanner's 140 mph serve brought the net down during the fourth set. Tanner lost to Vitas Gerulaitis in the semifinals. Tanner described his 1979 US Open win over Borg and loss to Gerulaitis in his autobiography as "the highest of my highs and the lowest of my lows on a tennis court within two days of each other".

Tanner's unorthodox but very strong left-handed serve was tossed very low and struck with a lunge involving the whole body, earning him the nickname "The Rocket". His booming 153 mph serve was the fastest ever recorded in tournament competition from February 1978 until Andy Roddick posted a 155 mph serve in a Davis Cup semifinal in September 2004 against Vladimir Voltchkov.

He won the Davis Cup in 1981 playing with John McEnroe, Eliot Teltscher and Peter Fleming on a team captained by Arthur Ashe that defeated Argentina in the final, played at Riverfront Coliseum in Cincinnati.

Grand Slam singles performance timeline

1The Australian Open was played twice in 1977, in January and December.

Grand Slam finals

Singles: 2 (1 titles, 1 runner-up)

Career finals

Singles (15 titles, 26 runner-ups)

Doubles titles (13 titles, 16 runner-ups)

Personal life
Tanner has been married three times, first to Nancy, then Charlotte, and last to Margaret. He has five children, Omega Anne Romano, Tamara Tanner, Lauren Tanner, Anne Monique, and Lacey Tanner.

Criminal record
Tanner has an extensive record of conflicts with the law. He was first arrested in 1997 for failure to pay child support. He was arrested again in June 2003 on a fugitive warrant on charges related to passing a bad check and to further nonpayment of child support. He pleaded guilty and received an initial sentence of probation. Tanner violated his probation and served one year in prison in Florida, but was then jailed for contempt of court in California.

In 2008, Tanner was again arrested for writing a bad check in Knoxville, Tennessee, but it was settled out of court. After being evicted from his home, Tanner was arrested in January 2012 for writing another bad check. In March 2013, Tanner was arrested in Florida for writing a bad check and grand theft, and in 2014, he served 10 days for driving with a suspended license. In 2015, Tanner was arrested for failure to appear in court on a previous warrant.

Tennis camps
Currently, Tanner has a venture in teaching tennis. He has taught at doubles tennis camps with other professionals, and is the camp director at his own training camp.

References

External links
 
 
 

1951 births
Living people
American male tennis players
American people convicted of fraud
Australian Open (tennis) champions
Grand Slam (tennis) champions in men's singles
People from Charleston County, South Carolina
Sportspeople from Chattanooga, Tennessee
Sportspeople from Orange County, California
People from Pinellas County, Florida
Stanford Cardinal men's tennis players
Tennis people from South Carolina
Tennis people from Tennessee
People from Vero Beach, Florida